Rum and Wall Paper is a 1915 American short comedy film starring Fatty Arbuckle.

Cast
 Roscoe 'Fatty' Arbuckle
 Chester Conklin
 Alice Davenport
 Charles Murray
 Mabel Normand
 Frank Hayes

See also
 Fatty Arbuckle filmography

External links

1915 films
1915 comedy films
1915 short films
American silent short films
American black-and-white films
Silent American comedy films
Films directed by Charles Avery
American comedy short films
1910s American films